Naremburn is a suburb on the lower North Shore of Sydney, New South Wales, Australia. Naremburn is located 6 kilometres north of the Sydney central business district, in the local government area of the City of Willoughby.

History
The suburb name dates to the 1800s but its origin cannot be verified. Naremburn was originally known as Central Township. The earliest land grants in the area were granted to Humphrey Evans and Peter Dargan in 1794.

A small cave in Flat Rock Gully near Naremburn, was believed to be where Henry Lawson, the Australian writer and bush poet, slept off his frequent visits to Australian pubs.

Naremburn Post Office opened on 20 March 1882 and closed in 1996.

Population
In the 2016 Census, there were 5,884 people in Naremburn.  61.4% of people were born in Australia. The next most common countries of birth were England 5.4%, China 2.9% and New Zealand 2.6%. 72.4% of people only spoke English at home. Other languages spoken at home included Mandarin 3.3%, Cantonese 2.7% and Japanese 1.9%. The most common responses for religion were No Religion 36.9%, Catholic 23.9% and Anglican 14.0%.

Commercial area
Naremburn has a small shopping strip on Willoughby Road about ten minutes' walk from Crows Nest.

Churches
 St Leonards Catholic Church, built in 1913
St Cuthberts Anglican Church (Naremburn Cammeray Anglican Church)

Former primary schools
Until the 1990s, there were two primary schools operating – St Leonard's Catholic Primary School, and, Naremburn Public School – both on Willoughby Road. The Catholic school shared the same site as the adjacent Catholic church, and, the public school was located opposite on Willoughby Road. Changing demographics and corresponding lack of demand led to both schools being closed within five years of each other. The former Catholic school is now a creative arts learning centre. The former public school is now a housing development.

Transport

Bus routes 114 from Balmoral and 115 from Sydney CBD travel through Naremburn to Chatswood, with stops located along Willoughby Road.

The closest railway station is St Leonards railway station on the Northern and North Shore & Western Lines of the Sydney Trains network.

The Warringah Freeway to the city runs through the suburb.

Gallery

References

External links

Naremburn community profile
  [CC-By-SA]

Suburbs of Sydney
City of Willoughby